"Quimbara" is a song performed by Cuban recording artist Celia Cruz and Dominican recording artist Johnny Pacheco. The song written by 20 year old Junior Cepeda from Puerto Rico, was released as the lead single from Cruz and Pacheco's joint studio album Celia & Johnny (1974).

Cover versions
In 1997, American salsa group Dark Latin Groove covered the song in a duet with Puerto Rican recording artist Ivy Queen, on their second studio album Swing On. This version of the song peaked at number twenty-five on the Billboard Digital Tropical Songs chart in 2010.

American entertainer Jennifer Lopez performed the song live as part the tribute to Cruz during the American Music Awards of 2013.
Lopez also added the song to the setlist of her Las Vegas residency, All I Have.

In 2004, Gloria Estefan, Patti LaBelle and Arturo Sandoval covered the song on ¡Azúcar!, a DVD musical tribute to Celia Cruz.

In 2015, Ivy Queen covered the song, in a medley, along with "Bemba Colora", on her ninth studio album, Vendetta.

In 2019 Angélique Kidjo covered the song on her album Celia.

Charts

Celia Cruz version

Dark Latin Groove and Ivy Queen version

References

1974 singles
1974 songs
Salsa songs
Marc Anthony songs
Jennifer Lopez songs
Ivy Queen songs
Celia Cruz songs
La India songs
Songs written by Sergio George
Song recordings produced by Sergio George